Sophia Bethena Jones (May 16, 1857 – September 8, 1932) was a Canadian-born American medical doctor, the first black woman to graduate from the University of Michigan Medical School. She founded the Nursing Program at Spelman College and was the first black faculty member at Spelman College.

Early life
Sophia Bethena Jones was born in Chatham, Ontario, the daughter of James Monroe Jones and Emily F. Francis Jones. Her father, who was a gunsmith by trade, was born in North Carolina and was one of the first black graduates of Oberlin College. He was born into an enslaved family and purchased their freedom in 1843. In the year Sophia was born, he was involved with John Brown's abolition activities in Canada.

She had three sisters: Anna Jones, Fredericka Jones, and Emma Jones, and two brothers: George Jones and James Jones. Her sisters Anna H. Jones (1855–1932) and Fredericka F. Jones (1860–1905) both became teachers.

Sophia B. Jones attended the University of Michigan Medical School, finishing in 1885 as the school's first black female graduate.

Career
Sophia B. Jones became the first black faculty member at Spelman College when she was hired in 1885. While at Spelman, she organized the school's nurses training program and led their infirmary.

After her time at Spelman, Jones worked at Wilberforce University, and practiced medicine in St. Louis, Philadelphia, and Kansas City. She also earned a patent in 1890 for a "Barrel trunk."

She had a passion for prioritizing public health and attaining health equity. Her article, "Fifty Years of Public Negro Health," was published in 1913.

Personal life
Late in life, Jones retired with her sister Anna to Monrovia, California, where they ran an orange grove. Sophia and Anna both died in 1932; Sophia B. Jones was 75 years old.

Legacy

The University of Michigan Medical School offers a lectureship in infectious diseases named for Sophia B. Jones. There is also a Fitzbutler Jones Alumni Society, an organization established to provide financial support to students and faculty by black alumni in 1997. They honor her and the school's first black graduate, William Henry Fitzbutler. There's also a conference room at Michigan named for Dr. Jones.

See also 

 Ludie Clay Andrews
 Spelman College
 Historically black colleges and universities
 Women in medicine
 List of African-American women in medicine
 List of African-American women in STEM fields

References

1857 births
1932 deaths
African-American physicians
Physicians from Kansas
Spelman College faculty
University of Michigan Medical School alumni
19th-century American women physicians
19th-century American physicians
African-American women physicians